The 2018–19 Segunda División play-offs were played from 12 June to 23 June 2019 and determined the third team promoted to La Liga for the following season. Teams placed between 3rd and 6th position took part in the promotion play-offs.

Regulations
The regulations were the same as the previous season: in the semi-finals, the fifth-placed team faced the fourth-placed team, while the sixth-placed team faced the third. Each tie was played over two legs, with the team lower in the table hosting the first leg. 

The team that scored more goals on aggregate over the two legs advanced to the next round. If the aggregate score was level, the away goals rule was applied (i.e., the team that scored more goals away from home over the two legs advanced). If away goals were also equal, then thirty minutes of extra time would be played. The away goals rule would again be applied after extra time (i.e., if there were goals scored during extra time and the aggregate score was still level, the visiting team advanced by virtue of more away goals scored). If no goals were scored during extra time, the winner would be the best positioned team in the regular season.

Road to the play-offs

Albacete were the first team to guarantee a finish of 6th or better, accomplished with a victory over Sporting Gijón on 25 May. Their chance at earning direct promotion ended with defeat to 4th place Málaga on 4 June. The simultaneous result of Granada picking up a point against 5th place Mallorca would have been good enough by itself for the club to earn direct promotion alongside Osasuna. Málaga's victory guaranteed their participation in the play-offs, and Mallorca's draw, combined with Cádiz's defeat to Extremadura, was enough to guarantee their participation as well. After the penultimate match day on 4 June, Albacete had guaranteed a 3rd or 4th place finish and that they would host the second leg of the semifinal round. The final club to confirm their participation was Deportivo La Coruña, who defeated relegated Córdoba on 8 June. Cádiz and Oviedo were both in contention for the final play-off place, but they both lost on the final match day. Mallorca's draw with Extremadura on the last match day was enough for them to finish 5th, while Albacete's defeat to Almería meant they would finish 4th, three points behind Málaga, who beat Elche.

Coming off their relegation from the top flight, Málaga were leading the league in the months of September and October, having won 8 of their first 11 games. Despite losing their advantage on the direct promotion places, the Andalusian club remained strongly in the play-off chase, only falling out of the play-off places on one occasion.

Albacete entered the season seeking a return to the top flight after 14 seasons out. One defeat in eighteen between the middle of October and the end of February vaulted them up the table, leading the league for the first time on 10 February. They remained in the top three for the rest of the season, until their defeat to Málaga on 4 June. The Manchego club finished with the league's second best offense, and were led by goalscorers Jérémie Bela and Roman Zozulya, each with 11.

Mallorca returned to the second tier at the first attempt after spending a season out of the top two divisions for the first time in almost 40 years. Around the play-off places throughout the season, a late season push of six wins in eight, plus three points picked up from the expelled Reus, helped cement the Balearic club's place in the play-offs.

Dépor were also seeking an immediate return to La Liga, and the Galician club established themselves as early contenders with just one defeat in their first eighteen games. However, a winless run from the middle of February to the middle of April jeopardized their chances, and they fell out of the play-off places. They were helped out by the form of promotion rivals Cádiz, who finished without a win in their final seven games, whereas Dépor had four wins in the same period, enough to finish in 6th position with a four point cushion. Both Dépor and Málaga sacked their managers in April, despite both clubs being in the play-off places at the time of their managers' departures. The two clubs also had the league's joint-second best defense.

Bracket

Semi-finals

|}

First legs

Second legs

Final

|}

First leg

Second leg

Notes

References

External links
Segunda División at La Liga website

2018-19
play-offs
1